The Serson Ice Shelf is a major ice shelf on the northern coast of Ellesmere Island in Qikiqtaaluk Region, Nunavut, Canada. It measured approximately  until 60 percent of it broke away in two large sections during summer 2008.

References

Ellesmere Island
Ice shelves of Qikiqtaaluk Region